Achievers University is in Owo, Ondo State Nigeria

The university is a private-sector initiative, established in 2007 and accredited by the National Universities Commission.
It is located on land in the Idasen community of Owo, consisting of Ulale 1, Ulale 11, Ulema, Ijegunma, Isijogun and Amurin Elegba (formerly Amurin, Ogain)

The university sprang from the Achievers Group of Education and Training Organization, located in Ibadan Oyo State of Nigeria owned and run by Hon (Dr.) Bode Ayorinde. Currently, the university is owned by Hon (Dr.) Bode Ayorinde and other notable personalities such as; Chief (Mrs.) Toyin Olakunri, Senator T. O. Olupitan, Senator Kolawole (Late) among 90 shareholders. The university commenced academic activities during the 2007–2008 academic session and has since then graduated 10 sets of students as at 2021.

In the Nigerian National University Commission annual university rankings for 2013, it was rated 53rd.

.The university offers pre-and bachelor's bachelor's degree programs in courses spanning arts, business, and social sciences, as well as science and technology.

In July 2012 it was one of the seven private universities in Nigeria to have its operating license suspended as part of a clampdown on private institutions offering unapproved or low-quality courses and substandard facilities. The license was restored on July 17, 2012, following an inspection by the National Universities Commission.

Courses offered 
Courses approved by the National University commission include:

A. College of Basic Health Science (COBHS) 

 B.Sc. Human Anatomy
 B.Sc. Human Physiology
 B.Sc. Public Health
 B.MLS Medical Laboratory Science
 B.NSc. Nursing Science

College of Engineering and Technology (COET) 

 B.Eng. Electrical & Electronics Engineering
 B.Eng. Computer Engineering
 B.Eng. Telecommunications Engineering
 B.Eng. Mechatronics Engineering
 B.Eng. Biomedical Engineering

C. College of Law (COL) 

 LL.B. – Bachelor of Laws

College of Natural and Applied Sciences (CONAS) 

 B.Sc. Microbiology
 B.Sc. Industrial Chemistry
 B.Sc. Biochemistry
 B.Sc. Computer Science
 B.Sc. Geology
 B.Sc. Plant Science & Biotechnology

E. College of Social and Management Science (COSMAS) 

 B.Sc. Accounting
 B.Sc. Business Administration
 B.Sc. Economics
 B.Sc. Political Science
 B.Sc. International Relations (including a three-month French language programme abroad)
 B.Sc. Public Administration
 B.Sc. Sociology
 B.Sc. Criminology & Security Studies
 History

See also 
Rufus Giwa Polytechnic
Federal Medical Centre

References

External links
 Official Website
Universities in Nigeria

2007 establishments in Nigeria
Educational institutions established in 2007
Universities and colleges in Ondo State
Owo
Private universities and colleges in Nigeria
Academic libraries in Nigeria